JADES-GS-z13-0 is a high-redshift Lyman-break galaxy discovered by the James Webb Space Telescope (JWST) during NIRCam imaging for the JWST Advanced Deep Extragalactic Survey (JADES) on 29 September 2022. Spectroscopic observations by JWST's NIRSpec instrument in October 2022 confirmed the galaxy's redshift of z = 13.2 to a high accuracy, establishing it as the oldest and most distant spectroscopically-confirmed galaxy known , with a light-travel distance (lookback time) of 13.6 billion years. Due to the expansion of the universe, its present proper distance is 33.6 billion light-years.

JADES-GS-z13-0 is located in the Great Observatories Origins Deep Survey – South (GOODS-S) field in the constellation Fornax, which includes the Hubble Ultra Deep Field.

See also 
 List of the most distant astronomical objects
 GN-z11 - Previous record holder from 2016 to 2022. (z = 10.957)

References 

Astronomical objects discovered in 2022
Galaxies
Fornax (constellation)
James Webb Space Telescope